The 2004 Formula Renault 2.0 UK Championship was the 16th British Formula Renault Championship. The season began at Thruxton on 11 April and ended on 26 September at Donington, after twenty rounds held in England and Scotland, with all except round five supporting the British Touring Car Championship.

Teams and drivers

Race calendar and results

Drivers' Championship

 Points were awarded on a 32-28-25-22-20-18-16-14-12-11-10-9-8-7-6-5-4-3-2-1 basis, with 1 point for fastest lap. A driver's 15 best results counted towards the championship.

Winter Series

Teams and drivers

Race calendar and results

Drivers' Championship

References

External links
 The official website of the Formula Renault UK Championship

UK
Formula Renault UK season
Renault 2.0 UK